The name Peipah (琵琶; Jyutping: pei4 paa4) has been used to name three tropical cyclones in the northwestern Pacific Ocean. The name was submitted by Macau and refers to the anglerfish. It replaced the name Vamei.

 Typhoon Peipah (2007), (T0721, 21W, Kabayan) – affected the Philippines and Vietnam as a minimal typhoon during November.
 Tropical Storm Peipah (2014), (T1404, 05W, Domeng)
 Tropical Storm Peipah (2019), (T1916, 17W)- A weak tropical storm which only sustained itself for 12 hours.

Pacific typhoon set index articles